Changsha IFS Tower T1 is a skyscraper in Changsha, Hunan, China. Construction started in 2013 and completed in 2017. It is the 16th tallest building in the world and the tallest in Hunan. IFS stands for "International Finance Square".

This twin-tower development is based on Harbour City, a hyper-connected retail development in Hong Kong. The Changsha complex will sport an underground network of linkages to a future interchange hub (Wuyi Square Station) for Changsha metro lines 1 and 2. The same underground passageway will connect with one of the busiest pedestrian streets in China — Huang Xing Road Pedestrian Shopping Street.

The development features two skyscrapers, with Tower 1 rising 452 meters and Tower 2 rising 315 meters. The rectangular form of the glass-clad towers is interrupted by a series of metal fins that add a hint of complexity to their appearance and reduce glare for the interior office spaces. Tower 1 features a crown that incrementally sets back by several meters at three points. Like many towers that break the 400-meter barrier, reduced floor plate sizes at the top are best suited for hotel uses—with guest willing to pay a premium for accommodations at such heights.

At the base, a block-sized podium contains a mega mall of 230,000 square meters. Changsha IFS Tower T1 also has 700 meters of retail street frontage, greater than that of its likeness, Harbour City. The retail mall, among the largest in Changsha and Central China, offers amenities spanning entertainment, lifestyle, culture, and dining.

See also
List of tallest buildings in China

References

Skyscrapers in Changsha
Skyscraper office buildings in China
Skyscraper hotels in China